, (born Eri Arakawa; 25 September 1986), is a Japanese fashion model, DJ, talent and Actor.

She belongs to LesPros Entertainment. She is particularly famous for her appearance in the women's fashion magazine "ViVi".

Early life
Eri Arakawa was born in Tokyo, Japan on 25 September 1986. Her father is Japanese professional photographer , and her mother is British creative director . At 12 years old, photographer Kishin Shinoyama spotted her and collaborated with her mother to release the photobook "ELLI-ROSE". Shinoyama recommended her to join a modeling agency.

Career
When she was 12, she made her debut as a model (Nicomo) for the teen fashion magazine Nicola. Since then, she has been active as a model for women's fashion magazine "ViVi" and lingerie brand "Ravijour" and she appeared on ViVi for 10 years from 2005 to 2015.

When "Gina", a sister magazine of "JELLY", was first published in 2011, she appeared in the first issue with Kana Oya, Shaula Vogue, Kozue Akimoto, Maiko Takahashi, Aya Hoshi and four other models. 

In 2007, she started working as a club DJ with fashion model Diego Limma and the DJ unit "Van Cliffe.D". The unit name comes from the combination of her companion's name "Diego" "D" and her British surname "Van Cliffe". Thereafter, she worked alone as "Van Cliffe" from high-brand parties to local festivals such as Trussardi, Shu Uemura and Yves Saint Laurent Beauté. In March 2014, she was a DJ at an event of Veuve Clicquot at Isetan in Shinjuku. She changed her DJ name to "Elli Arakawa" in the spring of 2015.

Personal life
She has good relations with fashion model Marie, who was with ViVi, since junior high school. She also has a good relationship with fashion model Koko Kinoshita. Elli Rose was a DJ at an event in which Kinoshita appeared. She's a close friend of Japanese model and singer Mary Sara since the beginning of her entertainment activities, and they often appear in magazines in the "Erisara" combination.

Appearance

Magazines
 Nicola (Shinchosha)
 CUTiE (Takarajimasha)
 Non-no (Shueisha)
 SPA! (Fusosha Publishing)
 SEDA (Hinode Publishing)
 Sabra (Shogakukan)
 VITA (KK Bestsellers)
 soup (Index Magazines)
 ollie Girls (Magazine House)
 MORE (Shueisha)
 JUNIE (Fusosha Publishing Co., Ltd.)
 S Cawaii! (Shufunotomo)
 BLENDA (Kadokawa Haruki Office)
 GLAMOROUS (Kodansha)
 SHEL'TTER
 ViVi (Kodansha)
 Olive (Magazine House)
 PS (Round House)
 An An (Magazine House)
 Music and people (Shinko Music)
 vikka (Sanei Shobo)
 Nylon Japan (Transmedia)
 Vogue Nippon (Condé Nast Publications)
 Gina (Bunkasha)
 TOKYO ViVi (Kodansha)
 it ♥ magazine (Kodansha)

TV shows
 Tokyo Girls Collection
 Kobe Collection
 TOKYO RUNWAY
 GirlsAward
 Taiwan SUPER Girls COLLECTION
 SHOW ROOM UNDER (Tokyo Collection)
 f * mode
 glamorous
 Niigata Fashion Business College
 roxy
 Campus Queen Collection 2009 in FUKUOKA

Photo albums
 "Elli-Rose" (Shinchosha, 1998) Photographer: Kishin Shinoyama Commentary: Miri Yu
 "MEDIA GIRLS Volume04 21st Century Beautiful Girls" (Clubhouse, 1999)
 "Mika Ninagawa Photobook like a peach" (Kodansha, 2002) Photo: Mika Ninagawa
 "Evergreen" (Shufu to Seikatsusha, 2005) Photo: Motoyuki Kobayashi

Advertising
 Yomiuri Land Pool WAI (2007, 2008)
 "Glassow Vitamin Water" (Coca-Cola Japan, Summer 2011, Photo: Mika Ninagawa) Nobuaki Kaneko, Ena Matsumoto, Rina Ota, Yosuke Kubozuka.

CM
 Unilever Japan "mod's hair" (2011)
 GU "Knit Wear Freedom." (2013)

Television
 PLAY ROOM Ver.2.0 (BS Fuji, 2001) Moderator on Monday
 Summer Sonic 05 (TV Asahi, 2005)
 MUSIC HEADLINE (Space Shower TV, April 2006 – December 2006)
 Mezamashi TV (Fuji TV, October 2006 – March 2007) --Hayami Musume (No. 1 reporter in the early ear trend)
 Good TV ~ HAO TV ~ (Fuji TV, 2006)
 Summer Sonic 06 (TV Asahi, 2006)
 studio XL (Space Shower TV, April 2008–)
 FOOTBALL CX --FOOTBALL DX --UEFA Champions League Digest (Fuji TV, September 2008–)
 Raji Karutu (NTV, 17 June 2008, broadcast on 6 January 2009) Appeared in the "Daisuke Shima's Ore-sama's Branch" section
 Happy Bean (RKB Mainichi Broadcasting, 24 December 2008–)
 Goddess Search (TBS, April 2009 – March 2010)
 Discovery of the World's Wonders! (TBS, 25 July 2015) Guest appearance

DJ
 2015, Dommune
 2016, Dommune
 2017, Dommune
 2016, Dax Space Shower
 2020, Boiler Room Tokyo
 2020, Contact Tokyo
 2021, collaboration with Frankie $

Radio
 Junko Koshino MASACA (7 November 2021, TBS Radio)

Other
 TV drama: Bishoujo H2 (Fuji TV, 1999) Episode 14 TWILIGHT PARADISE "Eri and Eri no Ishi", Eri
 Record sleeve: "Futari One Man II" (RYO the SKYWALKER, 2001)
 Film: Koala Kacho (produced in 2005, screened in 2006) * DVD (2006, avex trax, AVBC-22752)
 Radio program: Radicanthropus 2.0 (Radio Nippon, 23 May 2008) 29th Personality
 Catalog: "Ravijour Style Book" (Mook book, released on 23 April 2010) Co / Seri Iwahori, Mary Sara, Akane Satomi, etc.

Works

Books
 Photobook: ELLIROSE (Shinchosha, May 1998, ISBN 4103262109) Photo: Kishin Shinoyama.
 Photo art style book "ELLI-ROSE" (Takarajimasha, 24 February 2016).
 Room with good sound (Magazine House, 5 December 2017).

CD
 Album "VAN CLIFFE.D --ELLI-ROSE" (UNIVERSAL J, July 2007, UPCH-1727 / 8) * 2 disc specifications

References

External links
 Ameba blog: "Elli-Rose" Official Blog
 
 VAN CLIFFE
 Elli-Rose | Model-LesPros Entertainment

Japanese DJs
Japanese female models
21st-century Japanese actresses
1986 births
Living people
Japanese people of British descent
People from Tokyo
Models from Tokyo Metropolis